Atlético Onubense, is a Spanish football team based in Huelva, in the autonomous community of Andalusia. Founded in 1960 it is the reserve team of Recreativo de Huelva, and currently plays in the Primera División de Andalucía, holding home games at Ciudad Deportiva Recreativo de Huelva, with a 1,300-seat capacity.

Season to season
As a farm team

As a reserve team

19 seasons in Tercera División

Former players
 Elvis Onyema
 Pedro Baquero
 Cheli
 Fidel
 Joselito
 Miguel Llera
 Pablo Oliveira
 Juan Villar
 Chuli

References

External links
Official website 
Futbolme team profile 

Football clubs in Andalusia
 
Spanish reserve football teams
Association football clubs established in 1960
1960 establishments in Spain
Sport in Huelva